Ghiyath al-Dīn Me’sud ibn Kaykaus or Mesud II (Ghiyāth ad-Dīn Mas'ūd bin Kaykāwūs bore the title of Sultan of Rûm at various times between 1284 and 1308. He was a vassal of the Mongols under Mahmud Ghazan and exercised no real authority. History does not record his ultimate fate. He was the last of the Seljuks.

Reign

Masud II was the eldest son of  Kaykaus II. He spent part of his youth as an exile in the Crimea and lived for a time in Constantinople, then the capital of the Byzantine Empire. He appears first in Anatolia in 1280 as a pretender to the throne. In 1284 the new Ilkhan Sultan Ahmed deposed and executed the Seljuq sultan Kaykhusraw III and installed Masud in his place. Ahmad's successor, Arghun, divided the Seljuq lands and granted Konya and the western half of the kingdom to the deposed sultan's two young sons. Masud invaded with a small force, had the two boys killed, and established himself in the city in 1286.

He led several campaigns against the emerging Turkmen principalities, the Beyliks, always on behalf of the Mongols and usually with Mongol troops. Notable among these is the expedition beginning late in 1286 against the Germiyanids. The Germiyanids were a warlike band of Turkmen ancestry, settled by the Seljuqs a generation before in southwestern Anatolia to keep the more unruly Turkmen nomads in check. Masud conducted the campaign under the tutelage of the vizier and elder statesman, Fakhr al-Din Ali. Though there were a few successes on the battlefield, the highly mobile Germiyanids remained a significant force in the region. Masud and his Mongol allies conducted similarly futile expeditions against the Karamanids, Eshrefids and Ottomans.

In 1297 in an atmosphere characterized by intrigue and near constant revolt against the distant Ilkhan authority, both on the part of Mongol officers and local Turkmen potentates, the hapless Masud was implicated in a plot against the Ilkhanate. He was pardoned but deprived of his throne and confined in Tabriz. He was replaced with Kayqubad III who soon became involved in a similar plot and was executed by Mahmud Ghazan. The impoverished Masud returned to the throne in 1303.

From about 1306 Masud, and the Seljuq Sultanate with him, disappears from the historical record. Although, latest findings in 2015 propose his grave has been identified in Samsun.

According to Rustam Shukurov, Masud II "had dual Christian and Muslim identity, an identity which was further complicated by dual Turkic/Persian and Greek ethnic identity".

References

Sources

External links
 

13th-century births
14th-century deaths
Sultans of Rum
Pardon recipients
13th-century Turkic people
Turkic rulers